Dennis James Allen (2 March 1939 – 9 July 1995) was an English football player and manager.

Born in Romford, Allen represented Charlton Athletic (1956–1961), Reading (1961–1970) and Bournemouth & Boscombe Athletic (1970–1971) as an inside-forward. He scored 89 goals in 358 league appearances. Dennis went on to be player-manager at Cheltenham Town.

His brother Les (b. 1937), son Martin (b. 1965), grandson Charlie Allen (b. 1992), great-nephew Oliver (b. 1986) and nephews Bradley (b. 1971), Clive (b. 1961) and Paul Allen (b. 1962) all played football professionally. Martin went on to manage Cheltenham Town himself.

References

External links
 

1939 births
1995 deaths
Footballers from Dagenham
Association football forwards
English footballers
AFC Bournemouth players
Charlton Athletic F.C. players
Reading F.C. players
Cheltenham Town F.C. players
English Football League players
English expatriate footballers
Expatriate footballers in Belgium
English football managers
Cheltenham Town F.C. managers
K.V. Oostende players
Dennis